Rajnish Kumar (Devanagari: रजनीश कुमार) is President, All India Prohibition council.

Early life

He is deeply influenced by the Gandhian philosophy of peace and abstinence. He is also a staunch campaigner for complete prohibition of alcohol consumption in India. He conducts advocacy programmes as a strong proponent of total prohibition all over the country in collaboration with the State Govt. Institutions and NGOs to fulfill and execute its many-fold programmes like de-addiction scientific propaganda and setting up organisation to start a satyagraha struggle to force the government to abolish the use of sale of liquors on non-violent lines. He has also represented India in various international and national seminars. He is also involved with Shanti sena or "Peace army", which was made up of Gandhi's followers in India. He is an Editor of Rajghat Samadhi Patrika and Nashabandi Sandesh.

Biography 

Dr. Kumar was born in Sheikhpura, Bihar. He received his Bachelor's degree in Indian History from the Tilka Manjhi Bhagalpur University, and a Masters in Gandhian thoughts and Ph.D. in Gandhian Studies from Tilka Manjhi Bhagalpur University.

Social affiliation 
 President- All India Prohibition Council, (Nashabandhi Parisad)  New Delhi.
 Ex-Secretary - Harijan Sevak Sangh, New Delhi
 Member- Governing  Body of Akhil Bhartiya Rachnatmak Samaj, Delhi.
 Ex-Member - Governing Body of KIIT College of Education, Gurgaon, Haryana.
 Member - Executive Body of Sarva Seva Sangh, Wardha, Maharashtra.

References

External links
  
"62 - Photodivision.gov.in." 2009. 5 May. 2015 <http://photodivision.gov.in/IntroPhotodetails.asp?thisPage=62>
"Graphic version - the White House." 2009. 5 May. 2015 <https://georgewbush-whitehouse.archives.gov/news/releases/2006/03/images/20060302-9_d-0267-1-515h.html>
  "Obamania hits Delhi, but all's quiet at Rajghat - Rediff.com ..." 2015. 7 May. 2015 <http://m.rediff.com/news/report/slide-show-1-obama-visit-obamania-hits-delhi-but-all-is-quiet-at-rajghat/20101108.htm
  Australian PM Julia Gillard in India
  Narendra Modi at rajghat

1967 births
Gandhians
Living people
People from Bihar
Tilka Manjhi Bhagalpur University alumni